Una noche con Sabrina Love (A Night With Sabrina Love) is a 2000 Argentine, Spanish, Italian, French, and Dutch film, written and directed by Alejandro Agresti.  The film is based on the Pedro Mairal novel.

The film was produced by Pablo Bossi, and co-produced by Thierry Forte, Sarah Halioua, and Massimo Vigliar.

The picture stars Cecilia Roth as Sabrina Love and Tomás Fonzi.

Cast
 Cecilia Roth as Sabrina Love
 Tomás Fonzi as Daniel Montero
 Fabián Vena as Enrique
 Giancarlo Giannini as Leonardo
 Norma Aleandro as Julia
 Julieta Cardinali as Sofía
 Mario Paolucci as Carmelo
 Luis Margani as Camionero
 Sergio Agresti as Soldier 1
 Oscar Alegre as  Carboni
 Damián Aquino as Hombres Bailanta
 Karina Berti as Secretary
 Jorge Bosicovich as Dancer
 Carlos Roffé as Montero

Production
Asked about the bed scenes she has with 18-years-old Tomás Fonzi, Cecilia Roth said the young actor was very nervous before that, but "hilariously, after the sex scene we had, he was much more relaxed with me."

Distribution
The film was first presented in Argentina on June 8, 2000.

Later the film was screened a few film festivals, including: the Miami Hispanic Film Festival, Miami, Florida; the Latin America Film Festival, Poland; and the Bergen International Film Festival, Norway; the Huelva Latin American Film Festival, Huelva, Spain; and the Lleida Latin-American Film Festival, Lleida, Spain.

Awards
Wins
 Huelva Latin American Film Festival: Silver Colon; Best Actress, Cecilia Roth; Huelva, Spain; 2000.
 Lleida Latin-American Film Festival: Best Actor, Tomás Fonzi; Lleida, Spain; 2001.

Nominations
 Argentine Film Critics Association Awards: Silver Condor; Best Actress, Cecilia Roth; Best New Actor, Tomás Fonzi; Best New Actress, Julieta Cardinali; Best Adapted Screenplay, Alejandro Agresti; 2001.

References

External links
 
 
 Una Noche con Sabrina Love at cinenacional.com 
  

2000 films
2000 comedy-drama films
Argentine comedy-drama films
Dutch comedy-drama films
Films about pornography
Films based on Argentine novels
Films directed by Alejandro Agresti
French comedy-drama films
Italian comedy-drama films
Spanish comedy-drama films
2000s Spanish-language films
Films distributed by Disney
2000s French films
2000s Argentine films